Terence Woods (born 4 December 1947 in Dublin, Ireland) is an Irish folk musician, songwriter/singer and multi-instrumentalist. 

He is known for his membership in such folk and folk-rock groups as The Pogues, Steeleye Span, Sweeney's Men, The Bucks, Dr. Strangely Strange and the short-lived Orphanage, with Phil Lynott. Woods also played with his wife Gay, billed initially as The Woods Band and later as Gay and Terry Woods.

Woods is most associated with the mandolin and cittern, but also plays acoustic and electric guitars, mandola, five-string banjo and concertina.

Discography

Albums

With Sweeney's Men
Sweeney's Men
The Tracks of Sweeney
Andy Irvine/70th Birthday Concert at Vicar St 2012

With Steeleye Span
Hark! The Village Wait

With The Woods Band
The Woods Band
Music From The Four Corners of Hell (without Gay Woods)

As Gay & Terry Woods
Backwoods
The Time Is Right
Renowned
Tender Hooks
In Concert (compilation of 1976 & 1978 BBC sessions)

With The Pogues
Poguetry in Motion (EP)
If I Should Fall From Grace With God
Peace and Love
Hell's Ditch
Waiting for Herb

With The Bucks
Dancin' To The Ceili Band

With Ron Kavana
Home Fire

Other releases
1968 Waxie's Dargle / Old Woman In Cotton, 7" single, Sweeney's Men (Pye 7N 17459)
1981 Tennessee Stud / I Don't Know About Love, 7" single, Terry Woods (with Phil Lynott)
1989 Misty Morning Albert Bridge / Cotton Fields / Young Ned of the Hill (Dub Version), 7" and 12" single (also cassette and cd), The Pogues
1989 White City / Everyman Is A King 7" single (also cassette and cd), The Pogues

Filmography
 Andy Irvine/70th Birthday Concert at Vicar St 2012 (2014), DVD

External links
 Gay and Terry Woods history on official Gay Woods website
 
 

1947 births
Living people
British folk rock musicians
Citternists
Irish folk musicians
Musicians from County Dublin
The Pogues members
Steeleye Span members